Swami Haridas Sangeet Sammelan (English: Swami Haridas Music Festival) is a noted Hindustani classical music and dance festival organized by Sur Singar Samsad, and held annually in Mumbai, India. All the prominent Indian classical vocalists, instrumentalists and dancers perform at the week-long festival.

History
It was started in 1952 in honor of 16th-century saint, Swami Haridas by Sur Singar Samsad.

See also

List of Indian classical music festivals

References

Hindustani classical music festivals
Culture of Mumbai
Music festivals established in 1952
1952 establishments in Bombay State
Dance festivals in India
Islamic music festivals